Cassa Hotel & Residences is a 48-story building at 70 West 45th Street in Midtown Manhattan in New York City. It was designed by TEN Arquitectos headed by Mexican architect Enrique Norten in collaboration with the American design firm CetraRuddy and developed by Solly Assa's Assa Properties. 

The building is a combination of a boutique hotel, spanning from the second to the 27th floor, and luxury condominiums from the 28th to the 48th floor.

The building, originally scheduled to open in Spring 2010, opened on August 1, 2010.

References

External links
 Cassa Hotel & Residences Official Website
 Ten Arquitectos 
Cetra Ruddy

Residential buildings completed in 2010
Skyscraper hotels in Manhattan
Residential skyscrapers in Manhattan
Residential condominiums in New York City
Midtown Manhattan
2010 establishments in New York City